Jakub Zabłocki (14 July 1984 – 22 August 2015) was a Polish footballer (striker).

Career

Club
In February 2011, he joined Wisła Płock on one and a half year contract. He was released half a year later.

References

External links
 

1984 births
2015 deaths
People from Chełmno
Polish footballers
Sparta Brodnica players
Korona Kielce players
Pogoń Staszów players
Odra Opole players
Polonia Bytom players
Lechia Gdańsk players
Wisła Płock players
Siarka Tarnobrzeg players
Olimpia Grudziądz players
Association football forwards
Sportspeople from Kuyavian-Pomeranian Voivodeship